Ludewig is a surname. Notable people with the surname include:

 Dieterich Bernhard Ludewig (1707–1740), German organist
 Elsa Ludewig-Verdehr (born 1936), American clarinetist 
 Frank A. Ludewig (1863–1940), Dutch architect 
 Heinz Ludewig (1889–1950), German footballer
 Johanna Ludewig (1891-1958), German politician
 Johannes Ludewig (born 1945), German businessman 
 Jörg Ludewig (born 1975), German cyclist
 Uwe Ludewig (born 1967), German agricultural scientist

See also
 Ludwig (disambiguation)

Surnames from given names